The Primitive Way is one of the paths of the Camino de Santiago. It begins in the old Asturian capital of Oviedo and runs west to Lugo and then south to Santiago de Compostela joining the more popular French Way in Melide for the last two hiking days. According to the Confraternity of St James, the Camino Primitivo is approximately 320 km (199 miles) in length.

Middle Ages
The Camino Primitivo is thought of as the "Original Way" because it is reportedly the path taken by the first reported pilgrim, Alfonso II of Asturias (842), nicknamed the Chaste. The King left his capital, Oviedo, in the year 814 to travel to the present location of the city of Santiago de Compostela, at the time known as Mount Libredón. Alfonso built the original shrine to Saint James on the spot of the discovery. Until the city of León was established as both the capital of the Kingdom of León and the nexus of a safe route — the French Way — for pilgrims travelling across the Meseta, the Camino Primitivo remained the most frequented route for those going to Santiago for religious reasons.

Modern revival
The Camino Primitivo remains as a popular alternative path, which avoids most of the much heavier-travelled Camino Francés and the crowds of pilgrims there. Though incorporating significant vertical components, it allows hikers to enjoy a more stimulating journey with better views.

The route has been growing rapidly in popularity in recent years, with corresponding improvements to waymarking and to the provision of hostel accommodation for pilgrims (the so-called albergues). In 2016, 12,089 pilgrims, representing 4.35% of the total completing the Camino de Santiago in that year, walked the Camino Primitivo. Most commenced their journey at Oviedo, with smaller numbers joining the trail at Lugo and at Grandas de Salime. The Primitivo is now the fourth most popular Camino route, behind the Francés, Portugués Central, and Norte.

References

Camino de Santiago routes